Bulova was a Hong Kong football club which were dissolved after the 1984–85 season.

In 1977, Bulova entered Hong Kong Third Division League and proposed a three-year plan to get promotion to First Division. In 1979–80 season, Bulova appeared the first time in Hong Kong First Division League.

The team organised many exhibition matches which attracted many spectators. Some of the famous ones include the match against Liverpool in 1983 and against Manchester United in 1984.

They won a double of Hong Kong FA Cup and Hong Kong Viceroy Cup in 1981–82 and 1982–83. They were also runners-up of FA Cup in 1979–80 and won the Hong Kong Senior Shield in 1984. They were also runners-up in the Hong Kong First Division League in 1982–83 and 1983–84.

References

Defunct football clubs in Hong Kong
Association football clubs established in 1977
Association football clubs disestablished in 1985
1977 establishments in Hong Kong
1985 disestablishments in Hong Kong